Great Friends Meeting House is a meeting house of the Religious Society of Friends (Quakers) built in 1699 in Newport, Rhode Island. The meeting house, which is part of the Newport Historic District, is currently open as a museum owned by the Newport Historical Society.

Description
The meeting house is the oldest surviving house of worship in Rhode Island. In keeping with Quaker notions of "plain style" living, the building lacks adornments like pulpits, statuary, steeples, or stained glass. It features wide-plank floors, plain benches, a balcony, a beam ceiling, and a shingle exterior.

The original building measured two stories tall and about forty-five feet square, with a steeply pitched hip roof with a turret at the junction of the four roof slopes. Inside, massive framing timbers measure twelve inches square by forty-five feet long, supporting an open worship space with a second-floor gallery on three sides.

History
The Quaker community in Newport largely controlled the culture and politics of the town in the 17th and 18th centuries, and many Quakers lived nearby in the historic "Easton's Point" section of Newport, where their houses have survived. The meeting house was built on land owned by Nicholas Easton who donated his land in the 1670s. It is likely Easton's house nearby on Farewell Street was used for the first Quaker meeting house before the current meeting house was built in 1699.

Upon its completion in 1699, the meeting house was the largest structure of any kind between Boston and New York.

Significant additions were made in 1730, 1807, 1857, and 1867 to accommodate the New England Yearly Meeting of Friends. The turret was removed in 1806.

The meeting house was used as a house of worship until the New England Yearly Meeting of Friends departed in 1905.  The local African American community used the building as a community center until the 1970s when architect Orin M. Bullock restored the building, and in 1971 its owner Mrs. Sydney L. Wright donated the structure to the Newport Historical Society.

In 2005 a dendrochronology survey of the building's tree rings confirmed a 1699 construction date.

See also
List of the oldest buildings in Rhode Island
Oldest churches in the United States
Portsmouth Friends Meetinghouse Parsonage and Cemetery

References

External links
Newport Historical Society meeting house website
Mrs. William P. Buffum, "The Story of the Old Friends' Meeting House," Bulletin of the Newport Historical Society, Number 40, April, 1922
Listing with photographs, floor plans, and historical data at the Historic American Buildings Survey

Religious buildings and structures completed in 1699
Museums in Newport, Rhode Island
Religious museums in Rhode Island
History museums in Rhode Island
Historical society museums in Rhode Island
Quaker meeting houses in Rhode Island
Churches on the National Register of Historic Places in Rhode Island
Historic district contributing properties in Rhode Island
17th-century churches in the United States
National Register of Historic Places in Newport, Rhode Island
1699 establishments in Rhode Island